Pen-y-Mount Junction station is the northern terminus of the Welsh Highland Heritage Railway (WHHR) in Porthmadog, Wales. With the opening of all three platforms, it has the most of any station in the Porthmadog area.

Pen-y-Mount Junction is the only narrow gauge junction station in Britain; it is the only junction station between two Heritage Railways in Britain, and also has the largest number of platforms of any narrow gauge station in Britain along with the New Romney Station of the Romney, Hythe, and Dymchurch railway. 
 
It opened on 2 August 1980 at which time it consisted of a single platform with a run round loop and was intended to be a temporary terminus.

In 1990, a siding was laid into the yard for works trains. After the Festiniog Railway Company gained the authority to rebuild the original Welsh Highland Railway (WHR), it was decided to turn Pen-y-Mount station into a representation of a typical WHR station.

In 1996, a replica WHR corrugated iron station building was constructed. Its design was based upon the original Nantmor railway station. Subsequently, genuine WHR fencing, including a kissing gate, was erected along the back of the platform.

In 2000, the WHHR began construction of the WHR main line, under the terms of their 1998 agreement with the Festiniog Railway Company. This included clearing, preparing the track bed, tracklaying and ballasting. The northern end of the WHHR line was also re-modelled and, in 2002, the existing headshunt was replaced with a full crossover so it could connect with the FR owned WHR main line. A new headshunt loading spur was also constructed. They also helped construct the mainline between Pen-y-Mount and the Porthmadog Cross Town Link.

The WHHR finished construction work in 2007. Under the terms of the 1998 agreement, they were allowed to use the new line and retain all revenue from it until the FR had finished constructing the remainder of the WHR. During 2007 and 2008, WHHR trains terminated at Traeth Mawr Loop rather than Pen-y-Mount. In 2008, the Traeth Mawr loop was removed and WHHR trains used push-pull operation.

In 2008, the Welsh Highland Construction Company (an FR Co. subsidiary) connected the two ends of the Welsh Highland Railway and took possession of the line from Traeth Mawr to Pen-y-Mount and, since 2009, WHHR trains have terminated at Pen-y-Mount. It is hoped that in future the WHHR will have running rights over the FR-owned WHR mainline and that the station will become an interchange between the two railways. The two companies, however, are still in discussion over these issues and have yet to reach an agreement. It is intended that Pen-y-Mount Junction will have three fully operational platforms, with lines to Beddgelert and both Porthmadog Termini.

References

External links
Pen-y-Mount Junction Station website

Heritage railway stations in Gwynedd
Welsh Highland Railway
Porthmadog
Railway stations in Great Britain opened in 1980
Railway stations built for UK heritage railways